Association Sportive Ville de Blida or ASV Blida for a short is a professional Volleyball team based in Blida, Algeria. It plays in Algerian Men's Volleyball League. The team won the 2002 African Cup Winners' Cup title. The club was founded in 1967 under the name of USM Blida.

Honors

National Men's Achievements
Algerian Championship :
 Winners (5 titles) : (1994, 1997, 1998, 2001, 2002)

Algerian Cup :
 Winners (3 titles) : (1997, 1999, 2002)

International Men's competitions
African Cup Winners' Cup :
 Winners (1 title) : (2002)

National Women's Achievements
Algerian Championship :
 Winners (2 titles) : (1972, 1973)

Algerian Cup :
 Winners (1 title) : (1973)

Notable players
Nassim Hedroug
Ali Kerboua

Algerian volleyball clubs
Volleyball clubs established in 1967
Sports teams in Algeria
1967 establishments in Algeria